Iaai is a language of Ouvéa Island (New Caledonia). It shares the island of Ouvéa with Fagauvea, a Polynesian outlier language.

Iaai is the sixth-most-spoken language of New Caledonia, with 4078 speakers as of 2009. It is taught in schools in an effort to preserve it.

The language has been studied by linguists Françoise Ozanne-Rivierre and Anne-Laure Dotte.

Phonology
Iaai is remarkable for its large inventory of unusual phonemes, in particular its consonants, with a rich variety of voiceless nasals and approximants.

Vowels

Iaai has ten vowel qualities, all of which may occur long and short. There is little difference in quality depending on length.

Iaai constitutes one of the few cases of front rounded vowels attested outside of their geographic stronghold in Eurasia, even if other cases have since been reported in the Oceanic family.

The vowel  is only known to occur in a half a dozen words. In all of these but  "dedicate", it appears between a labial (b, m) and velar (k, ŋ) consonant.

After the non-labiovelarized labial consonants and the vowel , the vowel  is pronounced .

Long vowels, which are twice as long as short vowels, are written double.

Consonants
Iaai has an unusual voicing distinction in its sonorants, as well as several coronal series. Unlike most languages of New Caledonia, voiced stops are not prenasalized.

Unlike many languages with denti-alveolar stops, Iaai  are released abruptly, and  has a very short voice onset time. However, the apical post-alveolar and laminal palatal stops  have substantially fricated releases , and may be better described as sounds between proper stops and affricates.

The labial approximants are placed in their respective columns following their phonological behaviour (their effects on following vowels), but there is evidence that all members of these series are either labial-palatal or labial-velar.  are sometimes pronounced as weak fricatives .

In many cases, words with voiced and voiceless approximants are morphologically related, such as  "night" and  "black". - and vowel-initial words have a similar relationship. The voiceless sonorant often marks object incorporation. However, many roots with voiceless sonorants have no voiced cognate.

The labialized labials are more precisely labio-velarized labials. If this turns out to be the situation, it would parallel Micronesian languages which have no plain labials.

Grammar

Notes

References
 Dotte, Anne-Laure (2013), Le iaai aujourd'hui. Évolutions sociolinguistiques et linguistiques d'une langue kanak de Nouvelle-Calédonie (Ouvéa, Îles Loyauté). Doctoral thesis. Université Lumière-Lyon2, Lyon, France. 528 pp.
 
 .
 .
 .
 .
 .
Tryon, Darrell T. Iai grammar. B-8, xii + 137 pages. Pacific Linguistics, The Australian National University, 1968.

External links
  Five stories in Iaai, collected by F. Ozanne-Rivierre, and presented in bilingual format (Pangloss Collection of LACITO-CNRS).
 Presentation of Iaai, including an extensive bibliography.
Database of audio recordings in Iaai - basic Catholic prayers
 Iaai Grammar at the Internet Archive

Loyalty Islands languages
Languages of New Caledonia